The Van Voorhees-Quackenbush House, known colloquially as the Zabriskie House, is located in the township of Wyckoff, Bergen County, New Jersey, United States. The original stone house was built c. 1740 by William Van Voorhees and enlarged in 1824 by Albert Van Voorhees. The original section of the house is now the dining room and part of the kitchen.  The home was purchased in 1867 by Uriah Quackenbush. His granddaughter Grace Quackenbush Zabriskie bequeathed the home to the Town of Wyckoff in 1973. The house was added to the National Register of Historic Places on January 10, 1983.

See also
National Register of Historic Places listings in Bergen County, New Jersey

References

External links

Zabriskie House homepage

 Wyckoff Historical Society

Houses on the National Register of Historic Places in New Jersey
Houses completed in 1824
Houses in Bergen County, New Jersey
National Register of Historic Places in Bergen County, New Jersey
Wyckoff, New Jersey
New Jersey Register of Historic Places